Spain won 18 gold medal, 13 silver medals and 12 bronze medals.

In 1988, Spain had competitors in archery, wheelchair basketball, swimming, weightlifting, shooting, table tennis and athletics.

Background 

The 1988 Games were held in Seoul, South Korea.   The Games used the same venues as the Summer Olympics. Competitors with spinal cord injuries, amputations, cerebral palsy, Les Autres and vision impairments were eligible to compete in these Games.

Closing ceremonies 

There were concerns that the number of medals awarded on the final day of competition would mean that competitors would not be able to attend the 1988 Games closing ceremonies where the flag of Spain was to be raised as the host of the next Games.

Archery 

One of Spain's bronze medals came in archery.  It was won by an athlete with a physical disability.

Athletics 

Six of Spain's gold medals, three silver medals and three bronze medals came in athletics. Eight medals were won by athletes with vision impairments, four won by athletes with cerebral palsy, and nine by athletes with physical impairments.

Swimming  

Twelve of Spain's gold medals, ten silver medals and eight bronze medals came in swimming.  Three medals were won by athletes with vision impairments, nine by athletes with a physical disability and one by an athlete with cerebral palsy.

References 

Nations at the 1988 Summer Paralympics
1988
1988 in Spanish sport